Long Stanton railway station was a station on the Great Eastern Railway, between Cambridge and Huntingdon. It served the villages of Longstanton and Willingham (being roughly midway between them), until closure in October 1970. The station was immortalised in 1964 in the song "Slow Train" by Flanders and Swann.

The railway line through Long Stanton remained open for freight trains from Cambridge to St Ives, Cambridgeshire, until 1992.  The track was removed and one platform demolished in 2007, due to construction of the Cambridgeshire Guided Busway; however, the station building remains in private ownership.  Parts from the platforms were preserved for re-use on the Mid-Norfolk Railway.

References

External links
 
 Long Stanton station on navigable 1946 O. S. map
 Video on the Cambridge Busway and the old Long Stanton railway station

Buildings and structures demolished in 2007
Disused railway stations in Cambridgeshire
Former Great Eastern Railway stations
Railway stations in Great Britain opened in 1847
Railway stations in Great Britain closed in 1970
Beeching closures in England
1847 establishments in England